1Team (Korean: 원팀, pronounced as: "One Team") was a South Korean boy band formed by Live Works Company in 2019. 
The name of the group means "Unique individuals become new as one".
The group consisted of 5 members. They debuted on March 27, 2019 with the mini album Hello! and debut song “Vibe”.
Members Rubin and BC earlier appeared in shows Boys24 and Mix Nine.

On March 10, 2021, the group was confirmed to be disbanding after their final group activities on March 14, and that the members' contracts would be terminated.

Career

Pre-debut Careers
The group was originally temporarily named team LWZ before debut.

Members
Rubin (루빈) – leader, vocalist
BC (비씨) – rapper
Jinwoo (진우) – vocalist
Jehyun (제현) – vocalist
Junghoon (정훈) – rapper

Discography

Extended plays

Singles

Filmography

Concerts & Tours 

 2019: Debut Showcase: Hello! 1Team
 2019: The 1st Fan-Con Just
 2019: 1Team Fan-Con
 2020: 1Team U.S Tour: Hello! Just One

References 

K-pop music groups
South Korean boy bands
South Korean dance music groups
Musical groups from Seoul
Musical groups established in 2019
2019 establishments in South Korea
South Korean pop music groups
2021 disestablishments in South Korea